Cotoneaster bullatus, the hollyberry cotoneaster, is a species of shrub in the genus Cotoneaster within the  rose family. Its natural range is in Western China (provinces of Hubei, Sichuan, Xizang, and Yunnan), where it is found in a range of woodland and shrub biotopes from 900 to 3200 m above sea level.

The plant was introduced into cultivation 1898, and is widely naturalised in Europe, New Zealand and possibly British Columbia in North America (although this is now considered to be the closely related C. rehderi, which was formerly treated as a variety of this species, C. bullatus var macrophylla).

Description

Vegetative features 

Hollyberry cotoneaster is an arching deciduous shrub, which grows to heights of 3–4 metres. Branches are terete with grey bark, and alternate leaves. Twigs are initially hairy, but lose the hairs to become glabrous at maturity.

The simple leaves have a short petiole (4–6 mm), which is usually hairless, and an oblong-ovate blade, usually 35–70 mm long and 20–40 mm wide. The upper leaf surface is dark green, wrinkled and blistered (bullate, glabrous or finely hairy; the underside is grey-green, finely hairy, especially along the secondary veins. Leaves have lanceolate stipules, 3–5 mm long, which fall soon after the leaves open.

Flowers and fruit
Flowers are grouped in corymbose inflorescence about 30–50 mm across, containing from 12-30 white flowers. The flowers themselves have 5 petals and 5 sepals, and are 7–8 mm in diameter. They have from 20-22 stamens and 4-5 free styles. Flowering time in the Northern Hemisphere is from May–July.

The globose fruits mature in August. They are 6–8 mm in diameter, red and contain 4 or 5 pyrenes.

Bibliography

References 

bullatus